Batrachorhina rufina is a species of beetle in the family Cerambycidae. It was described by Léon Fairmaire in 1897, originally under the genus Tigranesthes. It is known from Madagascar.

References

Batrachorhina
Beetles described in 1897